In five-dimensional Euclidean geometry, the quarter 5-cubic honeycomb is a uniform space-filling tessellation (or honeycomb). It has half the vertices of the 5-demicubic honeycomb, and a quarter of the vertices of a 5-cube honeycomb. Its facets are 5-demicubes and runcinated 5-demicubes.

Related honeycombs

See also 
Regular and uniform honeycombs in 5-space:
5-cube honeycomb
5-demicube honeycomb
 5-simplex honeycomb
 Truncated 5-simplex honeycomb
 Omnitruncated 5-simplex honeycomb

Notes

References 
 Kaleidoscopes: Selected Writings of H. S. M. Coxeter, edited by F. Arthur Sherk, Peter McMullen, Anthony C. Thompson, Asia Ivic Weiss, Wiley-Interscience Publication, 1995,  
 (Paper 24) H.S.M. Coxeter, Regular and Semi-Regular Polytopes III, [Math. Zeit. 200 (1988) 3-45] See p318 
  x3o3o x3o3o *b3*e - spaquinoh

Honeycombs (geometry)
6-polytopes